Kilduskland Reservoir is of the impounding variety and is located 2 kilometres west of Ardrishaig, supplying the village with its water supply.  The concrete dam is 9 metres high and it was completed in 1906.

See also
 List of reservoirs and dams in the United Kingdom

Sources
"Argyll and Bute Council Reservoirs Act 1975 Public Register"

Reservoirs in Argyll and Bute